The Hurricane Cindy (2005) tornado outbreak was a two-day tornado outbreak that was associated with the passage of Hurricane Cindy across the Southern United States starting on July 6, 2005 across the Gulf Coast states of Alabama and Florida as well as Georgia before ending in the Middle Atlantic Coast on early on July 8. The outbreak caused no fatalities and only one injury but was fairly strong, as there were three F2 tornadoes spawned due to Cindy. The hurricane itself killed three people, two in Georgia, one in Alabama. Cindy produced a total of 44 tornadoes across seven states in a two-day span. Just three days after Hurricane Cindy had stuck the Southeastern United States, a much stronger and deadlier storm, Hurricane Dennis, made landfall on the Florida Panhandle on July 10.


Tornado event
The outbreak began as the remnants of Cindy weakened over Louisiana. As the storm weakened, strong thunderstorms began to develop along the edges of the system in Alabama. The first tornado touched down near Semmes, Alabama at 3:00a.m. (CST). The tornado caused roof damage to several structures as well as knocking down several trees. Over the next ten hours, several F0 and two F1 tornadoes touched down in Alabama and Florida. Later on July 6, the remnants of Cindy were moving over Alabama and the activity shifted into Georgia. At 8:45pm (EST), a large tornado touched down near the Atlanta Motor Speedway causing severe damage to the structures in the complex. The tornado then moved into an airfield where several planes and helicopters were damaged. Numerous homes were damaged or destroyed by the tornado as well. The tornado was rated F2 by the NWS. The activity slowed for a short while before picking back up in early afternoon hours on July 7 as the remnants of Cindy moved through Georgia. At 2:10PM (EST) an F2 tornado touched down about seven miles south of Taylorsville, North Carolina where three buildings were damaged a mobile home was destroyed. About an hour later, another F2 tornado touched down in North Carolina. It touched down about four miles north-northeast of Harmony. The tornado damaged several buildings before moving into Yadkin County where an additional 13 buildings were damaged as well as severe crop damage to the tobacco and corn farms. By the nighttime hours, the activity was shifting into Virginia. Before the remnants of Cindy moved out into the Atlantic Ocean, seven F1 tornadoes touched down in Virginia. The outbreak ended early on July 8 as Cindy began to move out over the Atlantic.

Confirmed tornadoes

July 6 event

July 7 event

July 8 event

Atlanta Motor Speedway tornado

On July 6 at 8:45pm (EST), a large, half-mile-wide tornado touched down near the Atlanta Motor Speedway. The tornado was estimated to have had winds of 120 mph as it tore through the complex. Every building had sustained at least minor damage and some that were damaged beyond repair. On some of the condominiums, the roof had caved in. Most structures had their windows blown out. The five-story scoreboard was blown down as well. The track was not damaged, however, debris was littered all over it. The tornado continued on its path of destruction towards the Tara Field Airport, west of the speedway. There, eleven planes and five vintage helicopters were damaged. The tornado then moved towards the Edgar Blalock Raw Water Reservation. At this point, the tornado had already been weakening and shrinking. The tornado turned to the northwest and crossed into Clayton County. The tornado lifted shortly after at around 9:04 p.m. (EST).

Damage from the tornado was extensive. About $40 million in damages was caused to the Speedway as many buildings needed to be torn down and rebuilt. Nearby the airport, a Chevron Auto service station was destroyed and at least 60 homes were severely damaged and over 200 others damaged along the tornados' nine-mile track. Power to most of Henry County was out due to the damage.

Following the tornado, all races scheduled to take place for several weeks were cancelled; the first race after the repair work was finished was to take place on October 30.

In all, the tornado caused $71.5 million in damages and despite all the devastation, no one was injured by the tornado.

See also 
 List of tornadoes and tornado outbreaks
 List of North American tornadoes and tornado outbreaks
 List of tropical cyclone-spawned tornadoes
 2005 Atlantic Hurricane Season

References

External links
 The NHC's .

Tornadoes of 2005
Cindy Tornado Outbreak, 2005
F2 tornadoes
Hurricane Cindy Tornado Outbreak, 2005
Tornadoes in Alabama
Tornadoes in Florida
Tornadoes in Georgia (U.S. state)
Tornadoes in Virginia
July 2005 events in North America
Cindy tornadoes